Room 666 is a 1982 documentary film directed by German film director Wim Wenders.

During the 1982 Cannes Film Festival, Wenders set up a static camera in room 666 of the Hotel Martinez and provided selected film directors a list of questions to answer concerning the future of cinema. Each director is given one 16 mm reel (approximately 11 minutes) to answer the questions. The principal question asked was, "Is cinema a language about to get lost, an art about to die?" Wenders then edited this footage and added an introduction.

Directors interviewed include Steven Spielberg, Jean-Luc Godard, and Rainer Werner Fassbinder, who died less than a month after filming. The film was later screened out of competition at the 2006 Cannes Film Festival.

In order of appearance 
 Jean-Luc Godard
 Paul Morrissey
 Mike De Leon
 Monte Hellman
 Romain Goupil
 Susan Seidelman
 Noël Simsolo
 Rainer Werner Fassbinder
 Werner Herzog
 Robert Kramer
 Ana Carolina
 Maroun Bagdadi
 Steven Spielberg
 Michelangelo Antonioni		 		 	
 Wim Wenders
 Yilmaz Güney

References

External links 
  
 

1982 films
Films directed by Wim Wenders
Documentary films about the film industry
1980s German-language films
1980s French-language films
French documentary films
German documentary films
West German films
1982 documentary films
Cannes Film Festival
Films shot in France
Films scored by Jürgen Knieper
1980s French films
1980s German films